Events from the year 1982 in Michigan.

The Associated Press (AP) selected the state's top news stories as follows:
 The election of James Blanchard as Governor, the first Democrat elected to the office in 20 years;
 Unemployment in Michigan with 732,000 Michiganders out of work and a record unemployment rate of 17.2%;
 Mass homicides, including the February 16 murder of seven members of the George Post family on their hog farm near Farwell, the murder of a five members of the Paulson family near Allendale on March 13, and the murder of Bette Giuliani and her four adopted daughters in St. Clair County on April 7;
 Four rounds of cuts in the state budget totaling $778 million and resulting from the state's economic tailspin;
 New contracts between the United Auto Workers and the major automobile manufacturers;
 A continued slump in sales of American automobiles;
 Richard Headlee's nomination as the Republican candidate for Governor, defeating Gov. Milliken's chosen successor, James H. Brickley with Headlee losing to Blanchard in the general election as Milliken remained on the sidelines;
 Cold weather and heavy snow through the winter of 1982;
 Fraud charges brought by the Canadian government against Amway and four of its executives for allegedly using dummy invoices showing lower values to reduce customs duties paid for goods shipped to Canada; 
 (tie for 10th) The February birth of a baby to a 12-year-old rape victim in Kalamazoo who was denied an abortion after an unsuccessful court battle; and
 (tie for 10th) Super Bowl XVI between the Cincinnati Bengals and San Francisco 49ers held at the Pontiac Silverdome, the first Super Bowl held in the snow belt.

Office holders

State office holders

 Governor of Michigan: William Milliken (Republican)
 Lieutenant Governor of Michigan: James H. Brickley (Republican) 
 Michigan Attorney General: Frank J. Kelley (Democrat)
 Michigan Secretary of State: Richard H. Austin (Democrat)
 Speaker of the Michigan House of Representatives: Bobby Crim (Democrat)
 Majority Leader of the Michigan Senate: William Faust (Democrat)
 Chief Justice, Michigan Supreme Court:

Mayors of major cities
 Mayor of Detroit: Coleman Young
 Mayor of Grand Rapids: Abe L. Drasin
 Mayor of Flint: James W. Rutherford
 Mayor of Lansing: Terry John McKane
 Mayor of Ann Arbor: Louis Belcher (Republican)

Federal office holders

 U.S. Senator from Michigan: Donald W. Riegle Jr. (Democrat)
 U.S. Senator from Michigan: Carl Levin (Democrat) 
 House District 1: John Conyers (Democrat)
 House District 2: Carl Pursell (Republican)
 House District 3: Howard Wolpe (Republican)
 House District 4: Mark D. Siljander (Republican)
 House District 5: Harold S. Sawyer (Republican)
 House District 6: Jim Dunn (Republican)
 House District 7: Dale Kildee (Democrat)
 House District 8: J. Bob Traxler (Democrat)
 House District 9: Guy Vander Jagt (Republican)
 House District 10: Donald J. Albosta (Democrat)
 House District 11: Robert William Davis (Republican)
 House District 12: David Bonior (Democrat)
 House District 13: George Crockett Jr. (Democrat)
 House District 14: Dennis M. Hertel (Democrat)
 House District 15: William D. Ford (Democrat)
 House District 16: John Dingell (Democrat)
 House District 17: William M. Brodhead (Democrat)
 House District 18: James Blanchard (Democrat)
 House District 19: William Broomfield (Republican)

Population

Sports

Baseball
 1982 Detroit Tigers season – Under manager Sparky Anderson, the Tigers compiled an 83-79 record and finished fourth in the American League East. The team's statistical leaders included Larry Herndon with a .292 batting average and 88 RBIs, Lance Parrish with 32 home runs, Jack Morris with 17 wins, and Dan Petry with a 3.22 earned run average (ERA).

American football
 1982 Detroit Lions season – The Lions, under head coach Monte Clark, compiled a 4–5 record and finished fourth in the NFC Central Division. The team's statistical leaders included Gary Danielson with 1,343 passing yards, Billy Sims with 639 rushing yards and 342 receiving yards, and Eddie Murray with 49 points scored.
 1982 Michigan Wolverines football team – Under head coach Bo Schembechler, the Wolverines compiled an 8–4 record. The team's statistical leaders included Steve Smith with 1,735 passing yards and 72 points scored, Lawrence Ricks with 1,388 rushing yards, and Anthony Carter with 844 receiving yards.

Basketball
 1981–82 Detroit Pistons season – Under head coach Scotty Robertson, the Pistons compiled a 39–43 record and finished third in the NBA's Central Division. The team's statistical leaders included Kelly Tripucka with 1,772 points, Kent Benson with 653 rebounds and Isiah Thomas with 565 assists.

Ice hockey
 1981–82 Detroit Red Wings season –  Under head coaches Wayne Maxner and Billy Dea, the Red Wings compiled a 21–47–12 record and finished sixth in the National Hockey League's Norris Division. The team's statistical leaders included Mark Osborne with 41 assists and 67 points and John Ogrodnick with 28 goals. The team's regular goaltenders were Bob Sauve, Gilles Gilbert and Corrado Micalef.

Boxing

Other

Music and culture

Michigan acts performed five of the songs ranked on the Billboard Year-End Hot 100 singles of 1982, as follows:
 "Ebony and Ivory" by Stevie Wonder and Paul McCartney (No. 4);
 "That Girl" by Stevie Wonder (No. 43);
 "Why Do Fools Fall in Love" by Diana Ross (No. 54);
 "Mirror Mirror" by Diana Ross (No. 86); and
 "Do I Do by Stevie Wonder (No. 95)

Notable albums released in 1982 by Michigan acts included the following:
 Stevie Wonder's Original Musiquarium I, an album by Stevie Wonder, was released in May 1982. It reached No. 4 on the Billboard album chart.
 The Distance, an album by Bob Seger, was released in December 1982. It reached No. 5 on the Billboard album chart. The single "Shame on the Moon" reached No. 1 on the adult contemporary chart and No. 2 on the Billboard Hot 100.
 Silk Electric, an album by Diana Ross, was released in September 1982.
 Jump to It, an album released by Aretha Franklin, was released in July 1982.
 Zombie Birdhouse, an album by Iggy Pop, was released in September 1982.
 Nugent, an album by Ted Nugent, was released in August 1982.
 Yes It's You Lady, an album by Smokey Robinson, was released.

In October 1982, Madonna's first single "Everybody" was released. It reached No. 13 on the Billboard dance chart.

Chronology of events

January
 January 24 - Super Bowl played at the Pontiac Silverdome

February

March

April

May

June

July

August

September

October

November

December

Births
 September 25 - Garlin Gilchrist, 64th Lieutenant Governor of Michigan, in Detroit

Gallery of 1982 births

Deaths
 March 10 - Charles N. Agree, Detroit architect, at age 84
 August 19 - Fritz Crisler, University of Michigan football coach (1938-1947) and athletic director (1941-1968), at age 83 in Ann Arbor, Michigan
 November 3 - Ray Fisher, Michigan Wolverines baseball coach (1920-1958), at age 95 in Ann Arbor
 November 23 - Benny Friedman, Michigan Wolverines football quarterback (1924-1926) and Pro and College Football Hall of Fame inductee, at age 77 in New York City
 December 16 - Orville L. Hubbard, Mayor of Dearborn (1942-1978) known as the most outspoken segregationist north of the Mason-Dixon line, at age 79
 December 17 - Homer S. Ferguson, U.S. Senator from Michigan (1943-1955), at age 93 in Grosse Pointe, Michigan

Gallery of 1982 deaths

See also
 History of Michigan
 History of Detroit

References